The Suolama (Suolema) is a river in Krasnoyarsk Krai and Yakutia (Sakha Republic), Russia.

It is an area of permafrost, flat, lonely and desolate, devoid of settlements. The nearest inhabited place is Yuryung-Khaya.

Course  
The Suolama is a left tributary of the Anabar. Its sources are in the southeastern corner of fairly large Kieng-Kyuel lake of the North Siberian Lowland. It heads roughly eastwards / northeastwards all along its course within a swampy area with numerous lakes. Finally it joins the left bank of the Anabar only  from its mouth. The confluence is just a little upstream of Anabar Bay. 

The river is fed by rain and snow. Owing to the severe climate it is frozen between late September and early June.

See also
List of rivers of Russia

References

External links 
Schematic map of ancient terrains and kimberlitic fields in the Siberian craton
Fishing & Tourism in Yakutia

Rivers of the Sakha Republic
North Siberian Lowland